The Outsider is a 1956 book by English writer Colin Wilson.

Through the works and lives of various artists – including H. G. Wells (Mind at the End of Its Tether), Franz Kafka, Albert Camus, Jean-Paul Sartre, T. S. Eliot, Ernest Hemingway, Harley Granville-Barker (The Secret Life), Hermann Hesse, T. E. Lawrence, Vincent van Gogh, Vaslav Nijinsky, George Bernard Shaw, William Blake, Friedrich Nietzsche, Fyodor Dostoyevsky and George Gurdjieff – Wilson explores the psyche of the Outsider, his effect on society, and society's effect on him.

On Christmas Day, 1954, alone in his room, Wilson sat down on his bed and began to write in his journal. He described his feelings as follows:

The Outsider  has been translated into over thirty languages (including Russian and Chinese) and never been out of print since publication day of 28 May 1956. Wilson wrote much of it in the Reading Room of the British Museum, and during this period was, for a time, living in a sleeping bag on Hampstead Heath. He continued to work on it at a furious pace and:

Gollancz was the head of publishers Victor Gollancz Ltd.  Wilson  was inspired to send the book to him after he found a copy of the publisher's own book A Year of Grace in a second-hand bookshop, which led him to believe that he had found a sympathetic publisher.

Contents 

The book is structured in order to mirror the Outsider's experience: a sense of dislocation, or of being at odds with society. These are figures like Dostoyevsky's "Underground-Man" who seem to be lost to despair and non-transcendence with no way out.

Characters are then brought to the fore (including the title character from Hermann Hesse’s novel Steppenwolf). These are presented as examples of those who have insightful moments of lucidity in which they feel as though things are worthwhile/meaningful amidst their shared, usual, experience of nihilism and gloom. Sartre's Nausea is herein the key text – and the moment when the hero listens to a song in a cafe which momentarily lifts his spirits is the outlook on life to be normalized. 

Wilson then engages in some detailed case studies of artists who failed in this task and try to understand their weakness – which is either intellectual, of the body or of the emotions. The final chapter is Wilson's attempt at a "great synthesis" in which he justifies his belief that western philosophy is afflicted with a needless pessimistic fallacy.

Reception 

The book has never been out of print since publication day in May 1956 and has been translated into at least 30 languages. Wilson helped to keep the work fresh by adding to it over the years: the 1967 paperback edition included a fifteen-page postscript; a ten-page essay 'The Outsider, twenty years on' was added to the 1978 edition; and in 2001 an index appeared for the first time alongside fifteen pages of postscripts originally written for a Chinese translation. It is still published with enthusiastic comments from the likes of Edith Sitwell and Cyril Connolly adorning its cover. This reception – of his first book at the age of 24 – was a high critical watermark for Wilson which he did not achieve again until the publication of The Occult in 1971 after which he enjoyed a long and fruitful career as a writer, philosopher, novelist, lecturer and broadcaster until his death in 2013.

Sequels 
Wilson followed The Outsider with six philosophical titles, which have become known as The Outsider Cycle: Religion and the Rebel (1957), The Age of Defeat (The Stature of Man in the U.S., 1959), The Strength to Dream (1962), Origins of the Sexual Impulse (1963), Beyond the Outsider (1965) and the summary volume Introduction to the New Existentialism (1966). These were accompanied by a string of novels aimed at putting his philosophical ideas into action.

External links 
 Life magazine article Oct. 1, 1956
 List of works discussed in The Outsider, with links to online versions, where available

References 

1956 non-fiction books
Books by Colin Wilson
English-language books
Sociology books
Victor Gollancz Ltd books
Works about existentialism